Adeli may refer to:

Adeli, Benin
Adeli suit
AdeliMashhadi Iranian Crime family

People with the surname
Mohammad-Hossein Adeli, Iranian diplomat
Mohsen Adeli (born 1972), Iranian chemist

See also
 Adelia (disambiguation)
 Adele (disambiguation)